Austin Municipal Airport  is a public owned public use airport located two nautical mile (3.2 km) east of the central business district of the city of Austin, in Mower County, Minnesota, United States.

Facilities and aircraft 
It has one concrete runway: 17/35 is 5,800 by 100 feet (1,768 x 30 m).

For the 12-month period ending May 22, 2009, the airport had 25,420 aircraft operations, an average of about 489 per week: 98% general aviation, 1% air taxi and 1% military. At that time there were 25 aircraft based at this airport: 80% single-engine, and 20% other aircraft.

References

External links 
 

Airports in Minnesota
Transportation in Mower County, Minnesota
Buildings and structures in Austin, Minnesota